The 24th Mingren was held from March 2011 until the finals. The reigning title holder was Jiang Weijie, who defeated Gu Li 3–2 in the finals of the 23rd Mingren.

Tournament

Challenger decision finals

Finals

See also
For information on the preliminary rounds, see Igo-Kisen.

References

2011 in go
Go competitions in China